Türkân Akyol (October 12, 1928 – September 7, 2017) was a Turkish   politician, physician and  academic. She was the first Turkish female government minister, and the first female university rector in Turkey.

Early life
Türkan Akyol was born on October 12, 1928 in Istanbul. She completed her primary education in various places of Turkey due to her father's profession as a staff officer. She graduated from the Erenköy Girls High School in Istanbul, Turkey, in 1947.

Academic career
Akyol was educated in Medicine at Ankara University graduating in 1953. She became a physician specialized in pulmonology and pursued an academic career at her alma mater. She became assistant professor in 1965 and full professor in 1970. Between 1959 and 1965, Akyol conducted academic studies in the United States, France and the Netherlands.

In 1980, Akyol was elected rector of Ankara University, becoming again a first, this time Turkey's first female rector. She served at this post until 1982 when she quit due to disagreements with the Council of Higher Education.  She lectured at the university until 1983 when Erdal İnönü invited her to co-found the Social Democracy Party (SODEP). Akyol served the party's deputy chairman.

Political career

On March 25, 1971, she was appointed Minister of Health and Social Security in the cabinet of Nihat Erim, becoming so the first female government minister of Turkey. On December 13 that year, she resigned from her post in the government and returned to the university.

Türkan Akyol entered the parliament as deputy of Izmir Province following the 1987 general election. She returned to her post as lecturer at the end of the legislative term in 1991.  In 1992, she was appointed Minister of State responsible for Woman and Family Affairs in the coalition government of Süleyman Demirel.  In 1993, she was appointed minister again in the cabinet of Tansu Çiller, Turkey's first woman prime minister.

Akyol died at a hospital in Ankara on 7 September 2017 at the age of 88. She was buried at the Karşıyaka Cemetery following the religious funeral at Maltepe Mosque. She was mother of two children.

Legacy 
There is a hospital in Bursa carrying her name.

See also 
 Women in Turkish politics

References

Sources 

1928 births
2017 deaths
Academics from Istanbul
Erenköy Girls High School alumni
Ankara University alumni
Turkish pulmonologists
Academic staff of Ankara University
Turkish women academics
Rectors of Ankara University
Social Democracy Party (Turkey) politicians
20th-century Turkish politicians
Social Democratic Populist Party (Turkey) politicians
Health ministers of Turkey
Women government ministers of Turkey
Government ministers of Turkey
Ministers of State of Turkey
Deputies of Izmir
Members of the 33rd government of Turkey
Members of the 49th government of Turkey
Members of the 50th government of Turkey
Burials at Karşıyaka Cemetery, Ankara
Women heads of universities and colleges
20th-century Turkish women politicians